Bastian Badu (born 2 February 2000) is a French professional footballer who plays as a forward.

Club career
On 25 October 2019, Badu signed his first professional contract with Montpellier. He made his professional debut with Montpellier in a 0–0 Ligue 1 tie with Angers on 26 October 2019.

On 2 January 2020, Badu joined Ligue 2 club Chambly on loan for the rest of the season. The loan was renewed for the 2020–21 season.

On 2 July 2021, Badu signed for Le Mans. On 1 February 2022, he returned to Chambly on a deal until the end of the season.

International career
Born in France, Badu is of Congolese descent. He is a youth international for France.

References

External links
 
 MHSC Profile
 

Living people
2000 births
Footballers from Le Mans
Association football forwards
French footballers
France youth international footballers
French sportspeople of Ghanaian descent
Paris Saint-Germain F.C. players
Entente SSG players
Montpellier HSC players
FC Chambly Oise players
Le Mans FC players
Ligue 1 players
Ligue 2 players
Championnat National players
Championnat National 2 players
Championnat National 3 players